Ringstabekk was a station on the Kolsås Line (line 2) on the Oslo Metro system and the Oslo Tramway system. It was located in Bærum, between Bekkestua and Tjernsrud stations, 10.5 km west of Stortinget.

The station was opened on 1 July 1924 as part of the tramway, Bærum Line.

Along with most of the line, Ringstabekk was closed for upgrades since 1 July 2006 and its service temporarily provided by tram line 13, as an extension of the service from Jar to Bekkestua. Ringstabekk was never reopened; instead it was torn down in early 2009, and replaced with the New Ringstabekk Station.

References

Oslo Metro stations in Bærum
Oslo Tramway stations in Bærum
Railway stations opened in 1924
Railway stations closed in 2006
Disused Oslo Metro stations
1924 establishments in Norway
2006 disestablishments in Norway
Demolished buildings and structures in Norway